The 2013 Virginia Tech Hokies football team represented the Virginia Polytechnic Institute and State University (Virginia Tech) in the 2013 NCAA Division I FBS football season. The Hokies were led by 27th-year head coach Frank Beamer and played their home games at Lane Stadium in Blacksburg, Virginia. They were members of the Coastal Division of the Atlantic Coast Conference. They finished the season 8–5, 5–3 in ACC play to finish in a three-way tie for second place in the Coastal Division. They were invited to the Sun Bowl where they lost to UCLA. The team's 93 game consecutive sellout streak ended on September 7, 2013 against Western Carolina with an announced attendance of 61,335.

Personnel

Coaching staff

Schedule

Sources:

Game summaries

vs Alabama–Chick-fil-A Kickoff Game

Previous meeting was also in the Chick-fil-A Kickoff Game in 2009.

Western Carolina

@ East Carolina

Marshall

@ Georgia Tech

North Carolina

Pittsburgh

Duke

@ Boston College

@ Miami (FL)

Maryland

@ Virginia

UCLA (Sun Bowl)

1st quarter scoring: UCLA – Brett Hundley 7-yard run (Ka'imi Fairbairn kick); VT – J.C. Coleman 1-yard run ( Michael Branthover (kick)

2nd quarter scoring: UCLA – Hundley 86-yard run (Fairbairn kick)

3rd quarter scoring: VT – Branthover 22-yard field goal

4th quarter scoring: UCLA – Paul Perkins 5-yard run (Fairbairn kick); UCLA – Myles Jack intercepted pass from Mark Leal 24-yards return (Fairbairn kick); VT – Sean Covington 3-yard loss for safety; UCLA – Thomas Duarte 8-yard pass from Hundley  (Fairbairn kick); UCLA – Shaquelle Evans 59-yard pass from Hundley (Fairbairn kick)

Rankings

References

Virginia Tech
Virginia Tech Hokies football seasons
Virginia Tech Hokies football